The Scarlet Letter is a 1934 American film directed by Robert G. Vignola and based on the 1850 novel of the same name by Nathaniel Hawthorne.

The film has been preserved by the UCLA Film & Television Archive.

Plot summary 
Hester Prynne has a child out of wedlock and refuses to name the father (who is a respected citizen). For this, she is sentenced to wear a red letter "A" (for adultery). Her husband is long missing and presumed dead. When the husband returns and finds his wife with another man's child, he sets out to torture them. At last, the father reveals himself, with a letter "A" carved in his chest and dies after that.

Cast 
Colleen Moore as Hester Prynne
Hardie Albright as Arthur Dimmesdale
Henry B. Walthall as Roger Chillingworth
Cora Sue Collins as Pearl
Alan Hale as Bartholomew Hockings
Virginia Howell as Abigail Crakstone
William Kent as Sampson Goodfellow
William Farnum as Gov. Bellingham
Betty Blythe as Innkeeper
Al O. Henderson as Master Wilson  
Jules Cowles as Beadle 
Mickey Rentschler as Digerie Crakstone
Shirley Jean Rickert as Humility Crakstone
Flora Finch as Faith Bartle, the Gossip 
Tommy Bupp as Marching Boy (uncredited)
Iron Eyes Cody as Native American (uncredited)

Production
The first sound version of the story starring former Jazz Age comedian Colleen Moore as the ill-fated Puritan adulteress Hester Prynne, the film retained many of the silent film era players and studio sets from director Victor Seastrom’s 1926 silent adaptation starring Lillian Gish. Henry B. Walthall played Roger Chillingworth in both these film versions.

Under the influence of the recently re-imposed Production Code, director Vignola emphasized the guilt-ridden ordeal of the novel’s protagonists, which resonated with Hollywood censor’s preference for a depiction of “the moral failure of the central figures” as a cautionary tale, distinguish it from the Seastrom’s decidedly romantic film adaption.

It was shot in Sherman Oaks, California. It was the only film Colleen Moore ever said she made for the money. She was reportedly preparing to take her dollhouse on tour for charity, and saw the film as an opportunity to make a last film with friends.

Reception 
National Board of Review gave a negative review, criticizing the script and "Vignola's static, uninspired direction", but appreciated Moore's performance, considering it "the only good thing in the picture".

Footnotes

References
Jeff Codori (2012), Colleen Moore; A Biography of the Silent Film Star, McFarland Publishing,(Print , EBook ).
Colleen Moore research/history project page
Malcolm, Paul. 2004. The Scarlet Letter, 1926. UCLA Film and Television Archive: 12th Festival of Preservation, July 22-August 21, 2004. Guest festival guide.
Malcolm, Paul. 2004. The Scarlet Letter, 1934. UCLA Film and Television Archive: 12th Festival of Preservation, July 22-August 21, 2004. Guest festival guide.

External links
 
 

1934 films
Films based on The Scarlet Letter
1930s English-language films
American black-and-white films
Films directed by Robert G. Vignola
Films shot in Massachusetts
Films shot in California
Majestic Pictures films
American historical drama films
1930s historical drama films
Films set in the 1640s
1934 drama films
1930s American films